Dill Records  was a small punk rock/ska record label based out of Monte Sereno, California, that put out CDs/records from 1989-1998. The name is an allusion to initially the label's only band, Skankin' Pickle. The record label was started by Mike Park, a.k.a. Bruce Lee of Skankin' Pickle. The first other band with a release on Dill Records was the Tantra Monsters (Dill 006) in 1994. After the breakup of Skankin' Pickle, Mike Park continued releasing records, beginning the label Asian Man Records in 1996. Asian Man and Dill Records coexisted until 1998. Asian Man re-released many albums originally released by Dill Records, as all releases are now out of print and Dill Records is no longer in operation.

A partial Dill Records discography:

American record labels